Sea Patrol is an Australian drama television series which premiered on 5 July 2007 in Australia on the Nine Network. Each series contains 13 episodes, with the first season of Sea Patrol premiering on 5 July 2007, and concluding on 4 October 2007. The second season, titled Sea Patrol II: The Coup, debuted on 31 March 2008, and ended on 23 June 2008. The third season is titled Sea Patrol: Red Gold. Sea Patrol: Red Gold premiered on 18 May 2009 and ended 27 July 2009. The fourth season debuted on 15 April 2010 and concluded on 29 July 2010. The final season five started on 26 April 2011 and concluded on 12 July 2011. Over the five seasons, 68 episodes were aired.

Series overview

{| class="wikitable plainrowheaders" style="text-align:center"
|-
! scope="col" colspan="2" rowspan="2" | Season
! scope="col" rowspan="2" | Episodes
! scope="col" colspan="2" | Originally aired
|-
! scope="col" | First aired
! scope="col" | Last aired
|-
| scope="row" bgcolor="389CFF" height="10px"|
| 1
| 13
| 
| 
|-
| scope="row" bgcolor="FFA000" height="10px"|
| 2
| 13
| 
| 
|-
| scope="row" bgcolor="FF6464" height="10px"|
| 3
| 13
| 
| 
|-
| scope="row" bgcolor="002FA7" height="10px"|
| 4
| 16
| 
| 
|-
| scope="row" bgcolor="71AC37" height="10px"|
| 5
| 13
| 
| 
|}

Episodes

Season 1: 2007

Season 2: 2008

Season 3: 2009

Season 4: 2010

Season 5: 2011

Ratings

References 

General references

External links
 List of Sea Patrol episodes at the Internet Movie Database

Sea Patrol
Sea Patrol